is a Japanese actress, singer, and TV-personality. She was born in Ota, Tokyo, Japan, and is currently married to Jun Nagura of the comedy trio Neptune. She is a former Japanese idol singer who is now known as a television commentator and author who speaks about fashion, travel, personal health, and contemporary issues.

History

Biography
Marina Watanabe was born and raised in Kamata, Tokyo. It is said that her father named his daughter "Marina", an unusual name in Japan which comes from Latin, because he enjoyed yachting. On the other hand, it is also said that her mother decided on this name.

When she was 14 years old, she entered the Miss Seventeen Contest co-sponsored by CBS Sony and Shueisha at the encouragement of her mother and older sister, but was not selected. However, CBS Sony invited her to take singing lessons for a while.
In March 1986, she was discovered by star agents, and subsequently passed her audition tests to become an idol in the same year.  Soon after, she joined the all-girl idol group Onyanko Club. It was during her time within the group that she made her debut.  Her debut song "Shin Koukyuu Shite" (to breathe deep) became a number one song on Oricon charts, and later got her in the record books for setting the record for the youngest singer to have a number 1 Oricon hit (a record that stood for 15 years until it was broken by a member of the Morning Musume group in 2001). She was 15-years and 11-months old at the time.

After her idol club was disbanded, Watanabe continued to participate in various variety shows as a singer. Initially she used mainstream idol clothing in her performances. However, because she decided to purchase her own clothes and design her performance style while abandoning traditional idol styles, she became more popular.  Later, she was found to have talent as a comedian, thus she decided to take on more diverse roles such as that of a variety show announcer with a comedic yet sophisticated touch.  It was from this period on that others started to notice that she was trying to hide or down-play the fact that she once was a member of an idol group.

Throughout the 1990s she continued to build broad networks within the subculture genre of Japan as both an announcer and celebrity, which eventually led to her rising popularity.

Currently, she is famous in Japan for her essays and books concerning her hobbies of fashion, travel, and personal health. She is also known widely as a "Taiwan-know-all".

Personal life
After marriage to her husband in 2005, her official name was changed to Nagura Marina, as she adopted her husband's surname "Nagura".  However, she continues to work with her old maiden name, Watanabe Marina. She gave birth to her first child, a son, in December 2008. She gave birth to a daughter on June 24, 2010.

Discography

Singles
 "Shin Koukyuu Shite" (1986)
 "Howaito Rabitto no Meseeji" (1987)
 "Marina no Natsu" (1987)
 "Natsuyasumi dake no Saidosheeto" (1987)
 "Chiisana Breakin' my heart" (1987)
 "Mitsumete agetai" (1988)
 "Natsu no Tanpen" (1988)
 "Mou Yume kara Samenaide" (1988)
 "Calendar" (1989)
 "Niji no Shounen" (1989)
 "Mune ga Ippai" (1989)
 "Atarashii Kimochi" (1990)
 "Daisukina SHATSU" (1990)
 "Shiawase no Rinkaku" (1991)
 "Birthday Boy" (1992)
 "Ureshii Yokan" (1995)
 "Taiyou to HANAUTA" (1997)

Albums
 MARINA (1987)
 EVERGREEN (1987)
 CHRISTMAS TALES (1987)
 DIARY (1988)
 SUNNY SIDE (1988)
 MISS (1989)
 TWO OF US (1989)
 a piece of cake! (1990)
 FUNNY FACE (1990)
 mood moonish (1991)
 Ring-a-Bell (1996)
 Watanabe Marina Best Collection (1997)

Television appearances

TV dramas
 Kangofu Akademi-, Fuji TV 1987
 Osana Tsuma! Mama ha Abunai 17sai!, Fuji TV 1987
 Tokimekizakari, Fuji TV 1988
 Shinkon Monogatari, NTV 1988
 Yonimo Kimyouna Monogatari , Fuji TV 1990, 1991, 1992
 Waru, Yomiuri TV 1992
 O-cha no Ma, Yomiuri TV 1993
 Kachou-san no Kainen, TBS 1993
 Moshimo Negai ga Kanasu nara, TBS 1994
 KAMI-san no Waruguchi 2, TBS 1995
 Dear U-man, TBS 1996
 PIICHIna Kankei, NTV 1999
 Face ~ Mishiranu Koibito, NTV 2001

Variety shows
 Yuuyake Nyan Nyan, Fuji TV
 Tonneruzu no mina-san no Okage desu, Fuji TV
 Gakkou e Ikkou!"", TBS
 Zenigata Kintarou, TV Asahi
 Takeshi no Daredemo PIKASO, TV Tokyo
 Doubutsu Kisou Tengai, TBS
 Oshare KANKEI, NTV
 JANGURU TV ~ TAMORI no Kisoku ~, TBS
 PUROMOMANIA'', Fuji TV

Radio appearances
 Watanabe Marina Kaze no Marina (FM Yokohama)
 Across The View (J-WAVE)
 TIPNESS presents Watanabe Marina BOO-STAR Rocket ~fit for life~ (TOKYO FM)

Books
 Marina no Tamashii
 Marina no Tabibukure – Tawawa Taiwan –
 Amatsuyu na Gohoubi
 PIRATISU Michi

References

External links
 Official Website 

Onyanko Club
Japanese idols
Japanese actresses
Japanese television personalities
Japanese women pop singers
1970 births
Living people
People from Ōta, Tokyo
Singers from Tokyo